Marlon Lopez (born December 13, 1975) is a retired American Paralympic judoka who competed at international level events. He competed at three Paralympic Games winning two bronze medals.

Lopez contracted Stevens–Johnson syndrome when he was nine years old after having a severe allergic reaction to medication leading to him being partially sighted.

References

1975 births
Living people
Guatemalan emigrants to the United States
Sportspeople from Los Angeles
Paralympic judoka of the United States
Judoka at the 1996 Summer Paralympics
Judoka at the 2000 Summer Paralympics
Judoka at the 2004 Summer Paralympics
Medalists at the 1996 Summer Paralympics
Medalists at the 2000 Summer Paralympics
American male judoka